Antoine-Augustin Préault (6 October 1809 – 11 January 1879) was a French sculptor of the "Romantic" movement. Born in the Marais district of Paris, he was better known during his lifetime as Auguste Préault.

Biography 

A student of David d'Angers, Préault first exhibited at the Paris Salon in 1833. He was not favorably looked upon by some of the artistic community's elite due to his outspokenness and because he was part of the circle of activists who participated in the French Revolution of 1830. During that period of turmoil, Préault's studio was vandalized and many of his plaster models were destroyed. As a result of these circumstances his work has been largely overshadowed by his contemporaries.

Antoine-Augustin Préault died in Paris in 1879 and was interred in the Père Lachaise Cemetery.

 
 Words of nineteenth century critic describing Préault's work.

 Comments by Musée d'0rsay at time of exhibition held on Preault's work.
Préault is buried in the Pere Lachaise cemetery.

Works

Gallery

References A

References B

Auguste Préault : sculpteur romantique, . Author: compilation. (1997) Gallimard

External links
 

1809 births
1879 deaths
Burials at Père Lachaise Cemetery
19th-century French sculptors
French male sculptors
19th-century French male artists